Afrasura discocellularis is a moth of the  subfamily Arctiinae. It is found in Cameroon, Gabon, Ghana and Ivory Coast.

References

discocellularis
Insects of Cameroon
Insects of West Africa
Moths of Africa
Moths described in 1912